Tricentis is a software testing company founded in 2007 and headquartered in Austin, Texas. It provides software testing automation and software quality assurance products for enterprise software.

History
Tricentis was founded in 2007 by Wolfgang Platz and Franz Fuchsberger, extending their previous consulting business into a software company. The same year, it opened an office in Germany. Tricentis opened further offices in Switzerland in 2008, Benelux in 2009, and London and Sydney in 2010. In 2011, the company entered the US markets and opened offices in New Jersey and Los Altos. By 2018, the company had extended its presence in Asia-Pacific. The company is headquartered in Austin, Texas.

In 2000, Platz developed Tricentis Tosca Explorer, the predecessor to the core component of Tricentis Tosca. By 2006 Tricentis Tosca Commander was developed and launched into the market as the central GUI for the product. The product has since been extended to cover risk-based testing, test design, SAP testing, API testing, service virtualization, exploratory testing, load testing, and test data management in addition to GUI testing.

In 2012, Tricentis raised $9 million in early-stage investment from Viewpoint, now part of Kennet Partners. In 2013, Sandeep Johri became the CEO.

In 2017, Tricentis received $165 million in series B funding from Insight Venture Partners.

In July 2020, Tricentis entered a partnership with SAP, an enterprise software corporation. Under the partnership, the Tricentis continuous testing platform will be the testing platform for the SAP Solution Extensions program and is being integrated into the SAP Application Lifecycle Management (ALM) portfolio. The Tricentis tools use machine learning algorithms to identify potential integration risks between SAP and third-party applications. They are also used to automate end-to-end testing across SAP and associated applications.

In April 2021, Kevin Thompson became the CEO and chairman of the board.

Acquisitions 
In 2017, Tricentis acquired Flood.io, an on-demand load testing platform. 

In 2018, Tricentis merged with QASymphony, a test management software company and acquired Q-up test data management.

In 2019, Tricentis acquired IntelliCorp's change impact analysis for SAP product LiveCompare, as well as LiveModel and LiveInterface. Also in 2019, Tricentis acquired TestProject, a community-powered test automation platform. TestProject is built on the open-source test automation tools Selenium and Appium, and uses AI-based matching to automatically analyze applications and recommend add-ons to enhance testing. 

In January 2020, Tricentis acquired SpecFlow, which allows developers to define, manage, and execute human-readable tests using behavior-driven development (BDD).

In March 2021, Tricentis acquired Neotys, a performance testing tool for modern and legacy technologies including SAP, APIs, databases, and cloud native apps.

Services
Tricentis provides international services to several industries including the financial, commerce, insurance, healthcare, telecommunications, logistics and transports, utilities, and software industries.

In addition, it provides training and consulting services in the areas of software quality assurance. These services include programs related to test automation and transformation.

Products
Tricentis' main products include Tricentis Tosca, qTest, LiveCompare, NeoLoad, and Tricentis Test Automation for ServiceNow. Tosca is a continuous testing tool that combines multiple aspects of software testing (test case design, test automation, test data design and generation, and analytics) to test GUIs and APIs from a business perspective. LiveCompare is a change impact analysis tool that uses AI to detect potential risks within SAP ecosystems. NeoLoad is an automated performance testing platform for enterprise organizations continuously testing from APIs to applications.  Tricentis Test Automation for ServiceNow is a testing tool that is deployed on the ServiceNow platform.

References

External links
 

Development software companies
Software companies of Austria
Information technology consulting firms of the United States
Software companies based in California
Software testing tools
Graphical user interface testing
Software companies of the United States
Software companies established in 2007